I Live Too Fast to Die Young! is the tenth studio album by Finnish rock singer Michael Monroe. It was released on 10 June 2022 by Silver Lining Music.

Track listing 

2xCD Japanese Edition "Live! Too Fast To Die Young In Stockholm"

Personnel 
Musicians
 Michael Monroe – lead vocals, harmonica
 Steve Conte – guitar, vocals
 Rich Jones – guitar, vocals
 Karl Rockfist – drums
 Sami Yaffa – bass, vocals, guitar

Additional musicians
 Slash – guitar solo and additional guitars on "I Live Too Fast to Die Young"
 Lenni-Kalle Taipale – piano on "Antisocialite" and "Can't Stop Falling Apart"
 Suvi Aalto and Astrid Nicole – additional backing vocals on "Can't Stop Falling Apart" and "Murder the Summer of Love"
 Neil Leyton – additional backing vocals on "Everybody's Nobody", "Murder the Summer of Love", and "All Fighter"

Production
 Erno "Error" Laitinen – recording, mixing, producer
 Michael Monroe – producer
 Rich Jones – producer, artwork and design
 Sami Yaffa – producer
 Steve Conte – producer
 Karl Rockfist – producer
 Svante Forsback – mastering
 Bobby Nieminen – additional recording
 John Ewing – engineered Slash's guitars (track 7)

Charts

References 

2022 albums
Michael Monroe albums